Naa Oru Alien is the second studio album of the Indian music duo Hiphop Tamizha, consisting of Adhi and Jeeva. The album was released on 14 August 2020.

Overview 
On 4 August 2020, the label Think Music made an announcement through Twitter, regarding Hiphop Tamizha's comeback to independent (non-film) music scenario, with the studio album Naa Oru Alien. Adhi stated that he composed another studio album before Naa Oru Alien; however since the duo completed their work on the latter, he stated that this will be released first as marketing their comeback to independent music. The album talks about Hiphop Tamizha's journey back into "the planet that is the independent music space".

In an interview with The New Indian Express, Adhi stated regarding the title of the album:

The album features six tracks in total. The first single from the album, "Net ah Thorandha", was released on 6 August 2020, and the complete album was released on 14 August 2020, despite Think Music initially announcing that it would release on 15 August.

Track listing 
Adapted from Apple Music.

References 

2020 albums
Hip hop albums by Indian artists
Hiphop Tamizha albums